Parris Fluellen (born February 12), better known as Cha Cha, and currently Parris Franz, is an American rapper, radio personality and actress formally signed to Epic Records.

Early life
Cha Cha was born and raised in Detroit with twin sisters and began rapping at 10. She attended Cass Technical High School.

Music career
Cha Cha signed a deal with Epic Records after making guest appearances on the Hav Plenty soundtrack, Tash's Rap Life and Shae Jones' Talk Show. While with Epic, Cha Cha recorded and released her debut album, Dear Diary. The album had many high-profile guest appearances ranging from Nas to Juvenile and spawned a single entitled "New Millennium (What Cha Wanna Do)", charting on Billboard's R&B chart. After Epic album release, Cha Cha worked on several of Royce da 5'9"'s releases, appearing on his mixtapes Build and Destroy and M.I.C. (Make It Count, as well as on his second studio album, Death Is Certain. She has since starred in lead roles in films such as ‘A Day of Trouble’, and supporting roles on both MTV and TNT network series.

Radio career
Parris Franz was an On-Air Personality for Clear Channel and Radio One for a few years. She was the most requested to host parties and events such as the Super Bowl XL, The Red Bull Soundclash, awards shows, festivals and private events for Joe Dumars.

Acting career
Parris Franz attended Michigan State University where she took acting classes. She was on MTV's "The Lyricist Lounge Show" and wrote several episodes. Later on she appear on "Office Outbreak" as a news reporter name "Sasha", "Stomp The Yard 2: Homecoming" as a dancer, "Chocolate City" as a club patron, "Entourage" as a "Rave Promoter" and "A Day Of Trouble" as "Jennifer". She starred in television shows include "Meet the Browns" as a patient, "Christmas Cupid", and Lifetime show "A Cross To Bear" as "Tasha". Parris Franz has co-starred in films and short films such as "This Time", Soul Kittens Cabaret and more. She also was the lead role as "Mari Rodriguez" for a stage play entitled, "A.I.M.: Angry Insecure Men", written and directed by Angel Terron. The stage play also turned into a film with her starring as the lead. She was landed a role in a hit stage play "My Brother Marvin: The Marvin Gaye Story" and in a role on rapper Tupac Shakur's mother Afeni Shakur entitled; "Afeni Shakur: In Her Defense", directed by Hilda Willis.

Discography

Singles

Filmography

Film

Short film

Television

References

External links

Cha Cha/Parris Franz at Facebook
Parris Franz on IMDb
 

Living people
1980 births
Cass Technical High School alumni
Michigan State University alumni
American women rappers
African-American women rappers
African-American songwriters
Songwriters from Michigan
Epic Records artists
Midwest hip hop musicians
Rappers from Detroit
African-American actresses
21st-century American actresses
American film actresses
American television actresses
Actresses from Detroit
American radio personalities
21st-century American rappers
21st-century American women musicians
21st-century African-American women
21st-century African-American musicians
20th-century African-American people
20th-century African-American women
21st-century women rappers